Aspartate dehydrogenase is an enzyme that catalyzes the chemical reaction

L-aspartate + H2O + NAD(P)+  oxaloacetate + NH3 + NAD(P)H + H+

The 4 substrates of this enzyme are L-aspartate, water, nicotinamide adenine dinucleotide ion, and nicotinamide adenine dinucleotide phosphate ion, whereas its 5 products are oxaloacetate, ammonia, NADH, nicotinamide adenine dinucleotide phosphate, and hydrogen ion.

This enzyme belongs to the family of oxidoreductases, specifically those acting on the CH-NH2 group of donors with NAD+ or NADP+ as acceptor.  The systematic name of this enzyme class is L-aspartate:NAD(P)+ oxidoreductase (deaminating). Other names in common use include NAD-dependent aspartate dehydrogenase, NADH2-dependent aspartate dehydrogenase, and NADP+-dependent aspartate dehydrogenase.  This enzyme participates in nicotinate and nicotinamide metabolism.

Structural studies

As of late 2007, only one structure has been solved for this class of enzymes, with the PDB accession code .

References

 
 
 

EC 1.4.1
NADPH-dependent enzymes
NADH-dependent enzymes
Enzymes of known structure